Malay Nights is a 1932 American drama film directed by E. Mason Hopper and starring Johnny Mack Brown, Dorothy Burgess and Raymond Hatton. It was produced on Poverty Row as a second feature for release by Mayfair Pictures. It is also known by the alternative title Shadows of Singapore.

Synopsis
Pearl hunter Jim Wilson is on a visit to San Francisco from the Malay Peninsula when he encounters his old nemesis the card sharp Jack Sheldon. Jim tries to rescue Sheldon's girlfriend and her young son from his clutches. A series of mix-ups lead to Jim and her son returning to Singapore without her, and she has to work in a nightclub and bar to earn her passage. She arrives in time to help help Jim beat off a deadly attack by Sheldon and his gang.

Cast
 Johnny Mack Brown as 	Jim Wilson 
 Dorothy Burgess as	Eve Blake
 Ralph Ince as Jack Sheldon
 Raymond Hatton as 	Rance Danvers
 Carmelita Geraghty as	Daisy
 Georgie Smith as 	Sonny 
 Lionel Belmore as Buck - Bartender
 Mary Jane Irving as 	Salvation Lass
 Ted Adams as Sailor 
 Dorothy Vernon as Tenement Neighbor
 Pat Harmon as Sheldon's Henchman
 Blackie Whiteford as 	Poker Player

References

Bibliography
 Pitts, Michael R. Poverty Row Studios, 1929–1940: An Illustrated History of 55 Independent Film Companies, with a Filmography for Each. McFarland & Company, 2005.

External links

1932 films
American drama films
1932 drama films
American black-and-white films
Films directed by E. Mason Hopper
Mayfair Pictures films
Films set in San Francisco
Films set in Singapore
1930s English-language films
1930s American films